Cooking Channel is an American basic cable channel owned by Food Network, a joint venture and general partnership between Warner Bros. Discovery Networks (69%) and Nexstar Media Group (31%). The channel is a spin-off of Food Network, broadcasting programming related to food and cooking. Cooking Channel is available via traditional Cable Television as well as Discovery+ since January 2021.

History

As Fine Living 
The channel was announced by Scripps in 2001 and launched the following year as Fine Living (later Fine Living Network, FLN). The brand was positioned towards high-income viewers "who want guidance in helping spend their free time", and featured a mix of lifestyle- and leisure-themed programming dealing with topics such as travel and adventure, finance, real estate, "everyday pursuits", and technology. Scripps positioned Fine Living as a multi-platform brand, having launched a companion website, and purchasing a 49% stake in a free-circulation magazine that would be co-branded with the channel. Scripps planned to invest $100 million in original programming for Fine Living. The network was launched on August 21, 2002.

In 2007, Fine Living acquired primetime encores of the syndicated series The Martha Stewart Show. The network later added Whatever, Martha!, a series featuring her daughter Alexis Stewart and Jennifer Hutt comedically riffing over footage from Martha Stewart Living.

As Cooking Channel 
In October 2009, Scripps Networks Interactive announced that Fine Living would be relaunched as Cooking Channel in 2010, after the Great Recession and a severe decline in American personal income and spending effectively stunted Fine Living Network from any further ratings or programming expansion. The network would be a spin-off of Food Network oriented towards instructional and personality-based programming, which had been largely displaced by the growth of Food Network's reality and competition programming. The network airs both new series, and archived programming from Food Network. Cooking Channel launched on May 31, 2010 (coinciding with the Memorial Day holiday), pushed ahead from a planned launch later in the year.

Programming

Original series
Food Network stars Emeril Lagasse, Rachael Ray and Bobby Flay were among the first to air new programs on the channel, entitled Emeril's Fresh Food Fast, Week In a Day, and Brunch @ Bobby's.

Original programming included the Mo Rocca-hosted food education program Food(ography) and the combination reality TV series and cooking show Extra Virgin, featuring slice-of-life footage of actress Debi Mazar, her Italian chef husband Gabriele Cocoros, their two children, and assorted friends and family members. The weekly series Robert Earl's Be My Guest, which premiered in September 2014, features entrepreneur and restaurateur Robert Earl as he goes behind the velvet rope to share the best-of-the-best dining secrets and destinations. During February 2015, Cooking Channel premiered Unwrapped 2.0—a revival of the original Food Network series Unwrapped. Actress Haylie Duff presented The Real Girl's Kitchen and Haylie's America on the channel.

Other original series include Dinner at Tiffani's hosted by Tiffani Thiessen, Man Fire Food hosted by Roger Mooking, Food: Fact or Fiction? hosted by Michael McKean, Tia Mowry at Home hosted by Tia Mowry, Cheap Eats hosted by Ali Khan, Carnival Eats hosted by Noah Cappe, Rev Run's Sunday Suppers hosted by Rev Run, Unique Eats, Unique Sweets, and Donut Showdown.

Repeats
Shows airing on the Cooking Channel that are first to air in the United States but have previously aired outside the country come predominantly from cooks in Canada and Great Britain, such as Food Network Canada host David Rocco, who hosts the self-titled David Rocco's Dolce Vita and Irish chef Rachel Allen with Rachel Allen: Bake!. The following Cooking Channel programs are either "first to air in the U.S." or reruns that come from the Food Network library: A Cook's Tour, Ace of Cakes, Bill's Food, Bitchin' Kitchen, Caribbean Food Made Easy, Chuck's Day Off, Chinese Food Made Easy, Cupcake Wars, Drink Up, Easy Chinese San Francisco by Ching He Huang, Everyday Exotic, Everyday Italian with Giada De Laurentiis, FoodCrafters, Food Jammers, French Food at Home, Good Eats, Indian Food Made Easy, Iron Chef (original Japanese version), Iron Chef America, MasterChef Canada, Spice Goddess, Two Fat Ladies, and Tyler's Ultimate'', in addition to various past programs hosted by Julia Child and Nigella Lawson.

International versions

As Fine Living 
From September 3, 2004 to October 19, 2009, a Canadian version of FLN was broadcast under the name Fine Living. It was replaced by a Canadian version of DIY Network.

In Europe, FLN launched in 2010, replaced Zone Club, except Poland.

From March 26, 2014 to October 22, 2017, an Italian version of FLN was broadcast under the name Fine Living.

As Cooking Channel 
A Canadian version of Cooking Channel launched on December 12, 2016, replacing W Movies. It is operated by Corus Entertainment, who also operates the Canadian version of Food Network; Scripps Networks Interactive acquired a minority stake in the channel following its launch.

Carriage Disputes
A carriage dispute with AT&T U-verse resulted in Food Network, Cooking Channel, HGTV, DIY Network, and Great American Country being dropped by the provider on November 5, 2010; the dispute was resolved two days later, on November 7, 2010, after the two parties reached a new carriage agreement.

References

External links
 official website

Works about cooking
Companies based in Knoxville, Tennessee
Television channels and stations established in 2002
English-language television stations in the United States
Food and drink television
Food Network
Warner Bros. Discovery networks
Nexstar Media Group
2002 establishments in Tennessee
Former E. W. Scripps Company subsidiaries